Een goed stel hersens (Dutch for A good brain) was a Dutch television series broadcast by RTL 4. In the show, two duos compete against each other in several games which focus on cognitive abilities. Carlo Boszhard and Nicolette Kluijver presented the show.

Seasons

Season 1 (2017) 

The first season consisted of six episodes.

Season 2 (2018) 

The second season consisted of eight episodes.

References 

2017 Dutch television series debuts
2018 Dutch television series endings
Dutch television shows
RTL 4 original programming
Dutch-language television shows